Aquilarhinus (meaning "eagle snout" after the unusual beak morphology) is a genus of hadrosaurid ornithopod dinosaur from the Aguja Formation from Texas in the United States. The type and only species is Aquilarhinus palimentus. Due to its unusual dentary, it has been inferred to have had shovel-like beak morphology, different from the beaks of other hadrosaurs. It was originally classified as a Kritosaurus sp. before being reclassified as a new genus in 2019.

Discovery 

The holotype fossil (TMM 42452-1) of Aquilarhinus was discovered in the Lower Shale of the Aguja Formation in Big Bend National Park, Texas. Most parts of the specimen were collected in 1983, but additional elements were collected during continued excavations in 1999. The specimen was first described in 2001 as a new species of Kritosaurus, because aside from its rostrum it was morphologically very similar to Kritosaurus notabilis. The differences in the rostrum were interpreted as being a functional adaptation for "shoveling out and scooping up vegetation." Despite the fossil's identification within the genus Kritosaurus, its phylogenetic position remained unclear.

In 2019, the species was reclassified into a new genus and given its binomial name Aquilarhinus palimentus. Aquilarhinus comes from the Latin 'aquila' meaning 'eagle' and the Greek 'rhinus' meaning 'nose', referring to the unique shape of the rostrum, and palimentus comes from the Latin words 'pala', meaning shovel, and 'mentus', meaning chin, referring the shape of the predentary and its resemblance to a spade or shovel.

See also 
 Timeline of hadrosaur research

References

Notes

Sources 

 
 

Hadrosaurs
Late Cretaceous dinosaurs of North America
Fossil taxa described in 2019
Ornithischian genera